Musa ludens is a chamber music group from Slovakia, founded in 1981. Their repertoire contains Slovak and European middle age music, incl. old Slavonic liturgic songs and music from gothic till late renaissance. At concerts they wear traditional costumes and play replicas of Music Instruments of that time. Their performances were recorded by Slovak national TV and independent film producers.

Members
The group consists of 6 members, all have graduated at the music academy in Bratislava:
 Ján Pipta
 Ľudmila Piptová
 Alena Pitová
 Lucia Piptová
 Zuzana Piptová
 Igor Pasek

External links
 Group's homepage

Chamber music groups
Slovak musical groups